F5 is a heavy metal band based out of Phoenix, Arizona, which features ex-Megadeth bassist Dave Ellefson and ex-Megadeth drummer Jimmy DeGrasso.

History

Before F5 was formed, Dave Ellefson was the bassist for thrash metal band Megadeth. But in 2002, the band dissolved due to an injury to frontman Dave Mustaine's arm. Ellefson went on to produce a local band called Lifted, where he met guitarist Steve Conley and drummer Dave Small. After recruiting guitarist John Davis and vocalist Dale Steele, F5 was then formed.

In 2005, F5 released their debut album A Drug for All Seasons recorded with producer Ryan Greene, who had worked with Megadeth, Bad Religion, and NOFX. The record was released worldwide in 2005 via JVC (Japan/Asia), Mascot (Europe), and Cleopatra Records (North America). F5 toured in support of the album, including opening for Staind for one tour date on the Jägermeister Music Tour in 2006. MTV premiered the music video of F5's song "Dissidence". The song "Dissidence" is included on the compilation CD Unleashed 3.

In March 2013, the album was reissued exclusively on iTunes with a new bonus track, "Sleeping Giants". 

In 2008, F5 released their second studio album entitled The Reckoning, with Ellefson's former Megadeth band-mate Jimmy DeGrasso joining on drums after Small left in 2007, and Ryan Greene again producing. The album was released via OarFin Distribution (Koch), licensed to Nightmare Records in North America and Silverwolf Productions in Europe. A video emerged for the album's title track "The Reckoning", followed by one for an unreleased non-album cover of Fight's "Nailed to the Gun".

In 2009, drummer Jimmy DeGrasso returned to Alice Cooper's band. In early 2010, Dave Ellefson left to rejoin Megadeth, leaving the future of F5 unknown. In May 2013, Steve Conley left to join Flotsam and Jetsam.

Band members
Current
 Dale Steele – vocals (2003–present)
 Dave Ellefson – bass (2003–2010)
 Steve Conley – guitars (2003–present)
 John Davis – guitars (2003–present)
 Jimmy DeGrasso – drums (2007–2010)

Former
 Dave Small – drums (2003–2007)

Discography

Albums
A Drug for All Seasons (released September 13, 2005, via Cleopatra Records, produced by Ryan Greene)
 01 – Faded
 02 – Dissidence
 03 – Fall to Me
 04 – A Drug for All Seasons
 05 – Bleeding
 06 – What I Am (Edie Brickell and Kenny Withrow)
 07 – Dying on the Vine
 08 – Hold Me Down
 09 – Defacing
 10 – X'd Out
 11 – Look You in the Eyes
 12 – Forte Sonata
The Reckoning (released August 19, 2008, produced by Ryan Greene)
 01 – No Excuse
 02 – I Am the Taker
 03 – The Reckoning
 04 – Rank and File
 05 – Love Is Dead
 06 – Through Hell
 07 – Wake Up
 08 – Cause for Concern
 09 – My End
 10 – Control
 11 – Final Hour

Videos
Live for All Seasons
 "Dissidence"
 "The Reckoning"
 "Nailed to the Gun"

References

External links

 F5 official site
 F5 official MySpace page
 David Ellefson official site
 Jimmy DeGrasso official site
 Dave Small official site

Reviews
 F5 review at BC Music
 F5 review at Billboard
 F5 review at Blabbermouth
 F5 review at Cutting Edge
 F5 review at Rock Eyez

Interviews
 F5 interview at Garage Radio
 F5 interview at Hard Music Magazine
 F5 interview at Heavy Metal Resource
 F5 interview at Knac
 F5 interview at Metal Temple
 F5 interview at Shockwaves Magazine
 David Ellefson interview at Alternative-Zine.com

Musical groups established in 2003
Heavy metal musical groups from Arizona
Musical quintets
Musical groups from Phoenix, Arizona